John Mackovic (born October 1, 1943) is an American football coach.  He is currently the head coach of the Italy national American football team, which was formed to compete in the EFAF European Championship.  Previously, Mackovic served as the head football coach at Wake Forest University (1978–1980), the University of Illinois at Urbana–Champaign (1988–1991), the University of Texas at Austin (1992–1997), and the University of Arizona (2001–2003), compiling a career college football record of 95–82–3.  He was also the head coach of the National Football League's Kansas City Chiefs from 1983 to 1986, tallying a mark of 30–34.

Coaching career
Mackovic's coaching career began at Miami University in Ohio as a graduate assistant in 1965. He then served stints as offensive coordinator at San Jose State University and the University of Arizona before serving as offensive coordinator and assistant head coach at Purdue University in 1977.

Mackovic earned his first head coaching job in college football, taking over at Wake Forest from 1978 to 1980. Prior to his arrival, the Demon Deacons went 1–10; Mackovic led his teams to a 14–20 record, including their first bowl game in 30 years. In 1979, he was named the Coach of the Year by the Walter Camp Football Foundation.

In 1981, Tom Landry hired Mackovic as assistant head coach and quarterback coach with the Dallas Cowboys, with whom he spent two seasons before accepting a head coaching job with the Kansas City Chiefs in 1983. Mackovic would later name himself his offensive coordinator, a position he held all four seasons with the Chiefs. Mackovic's first three Chiefs teams missed the playoffs. In his final season, the Chiefs made the playoffs as a wild card, their first playoff appearance in 15 years and only their second since the AFL–NFL merger.  However, owner Lamar Hunt fired Mackovic only days after they were eliminated in the first round due to a lack of chemistry. The catalyst behind Mackovic's dismissal was a meeting between Hunt and eight of the most prominent Chiefs. Mackovic's record with the Chiefs was 30–34.

Following a year off, Mackovic resumed his coaching career when he was hired as the head football coach and athletic director at the University of Illinois at Urbana–Champaign in 1988. Mackovic took over a team that went 3–7–1 before his arrival, but whom Mackovic led to a 30–16–1, four straight bowl appearances, and a share of the 1990 Big Ten Conference title.

Mackovic's previous success of turning around college programs led him to the University of Texas in 1992. Texas had gone from a Southwest Conference title in 1990 to a 5–6 record in 1991. Mackovic won a share of the Southwest Conference title in 1994 and won it outright in 1995. He also won the inaugural Big 12 Championship Game in 1996. A year later, however, the Longhorns were pounded 66–3 by UCLA, the worst home loss in school history (and the second-worst loss overall).  The defeat is known to this day as "Rout 66." They never recovered and finished 4–7. Mackovic was fired after the season. During his tenure, Mackovic led the Longhorns to a 41–28–2 record and three bowl games.

Following his firing at Texas, Mackovic became a college football analyst for ESPN in 1998 for whom he worked until January 2001, when he accepted the head coaching job for the University of Arizona. Frustrated by an offense that was perceived as too conservative, Arizona hired Mackovic as head coach to replace Dick Tomey; however, Mackovic never posted a winning record in two and one-half seasons in Tucson, with a 10–18 record (a .357 winning percentage).

Midway through the 2002 season, Mackovic told tight end Justin Levasseur that he was a disgrace to his family. This and other incidents led 40 players (including future Pro Bowler Lance Briggs) to hold a secret meeting with school president Peter Likins. The players complained about Mackovic's constant verbal abuse, such as an ugly tirade after a loss to Wisconsin. Mackovic offered a public apology to his players, the university and fans.  However, whatever goodwill that he'd managed to restore quickly evaporated a season later; quarterback Nic Costa said that despite a very talented roster, many players had lost their love for the game due to Mackovic's brusque manner.  Five games into the 2003 season, Mackovic was fired and replaced by defensive coordinator Mike Hankwitz. School officials said they had to act because it was obvious the Wildcats would not win with Mackovic at the helm.

In 2006, Mackovic again returned to coaching when he was named as the head coach of the U.S. national team. He led Team USA to win the 2007 IFAF World Cup in their first appearance in the American Football World Cup held in Kawasaki, Japan.

Head coaching record

College

*John Hancock Bowl coached by Lou Tepper

**Fired after 5 games

NFL

References

1943 births
Living people
Army Black Knights football coaches
Arizona Wildcats football coaches
Dallas Cowboys coaches
Illinois Fighting Illini athletic directors
Illinois Fighting Illini football coaches
Kansas City Chiefs coaches
Kansas City Chiefs head coaches
Miami RedHawks football coaches
People from Barberton, Ohio
Purdue Boilermakers football coaches
San Jose State Spartans football coaches
Texas Longhorns football coaches
Wake Forest Demon Deacons football coaches
Wake Forest Demon Deacons football players